The 2011 New York Mets season was the franchise's 50th season and its third at Citi Field. Following a poor 2010 season, the Mets sought their first postseason appearance since 2006. However, they failed to make the playoffs for the 5th straight season.

Offseason
On October 4, 2010, one day after the conclusion of the 2010 season, the Mets fired Manager Jerry Manuel, along with general manager Omar Minaya. On October 29, the team hired former Oakland Athletics, San Diego Padres and MLB executive Sandy Alderson to replace Minaya as general manager. On November 23, Terry Collins was hired as manager.

As of December 3, 2010, the Mets non-tendered contracts to John Maine, Sean Green, Chris Carter which made them free-agents.

In December 2010, Mets owner Fred Wilpon was named in a lawsuit filed on behalf of the victims of Bernie Madoff's Ponzi scheme and on January 28, 2011 Wilpon issued a statement in which he intends to seek "one or more strategic partners" to buy a 20 to 25% interest in the Mets to offset pending losses due to litigation. As a result, the Mets were unable to sign any high priced free agents as they did during the Omar Minaya era.

In March 2011, the Mets released Luis Castillo and Óliver Pérez from the team. The two players became the target of the fans' wrath in the previous two seasons due to their poor performance on the field.

Regular season

The team began the season with high-priced stars Johan Santana and Jason Bay on the disabled list. Santana never played for the Mets in 2011, while Bay returned on April 21.

After seeing limited action in spring training following a 2010 knee injury, Carlos Beltrán started on opening day and played the full game.

The initial five-man rotation consisted of, in order, Mike Pelfrey, Jon Niese, R. A. Dickey, Chris Young and Chris Capuano.

The Mets started 2011 with a 3-1 record but, after losing consecutive doubleheaders on April 14 and 16, their record was 4-11, tying for third-worst in Mets history.  Only the 1962 and 1964 New York Mets seasons were worse after 15 games.  The seven-game losing streak was the longest since 2004 and the consecutive doubleheader losses were the first since 1982. However, the Mets went 7–5 to close out the month of April, with the return of Jason Bay and offensive power.

The Mets began the month of May with a memorable 2–1, 14 inning win over rival Philadelphia Phillies in Philadelphia on May 1. The Mets' Daniel Murphy was batting as a pinch-hitter against Phillies' reliever Ryan Madson when the fans started chanting "U-S-A!" in response to the news that Osama bin Laden, the mastermind of the September 11 attacks, had been killed by US Special Forces in Abbottabad, Pakistan. After the Mets won the game, Terry Collins said that catcher Ronny Paulino's game-winning RBI double in his Mets debut delivered "a good win for us, and obviously a huge win for America tonight." This win also conjured up parallels to their 3–2 win over rival Atlanta Braves on September 21, 2001 in the first major professional sporting event held in New York City since the attacks. Appropriately, the Mets hosted a Sunday night game on ESPN on September 11 to mark the tenth anniversary of the attacks.

Justin Turner contributed to the Mets' success in the month of May, becoming the first Met to be named the NL Rookie of the Month since the award's creation in 2001. On May 26, the Mets agreed to sell a portion of the team to hedge fund manager David Einhorn for $200 million, making him a minority owner of the team. The deal with Einhorn ultimately fell through.

On June 28, playing against the Detroit Tigers, Jason Bay and Carlos Beltrán both hit grand slams in a 14-3 rout. It marked only the second time in Mets history that the team hit two grand slams in the same game (the other time coming in 2006 when Beltran and Cliff Floyd connected in the same inning against the Cubs). It also broke a drought in which the Mets had not hit a grand slam in 299 team games, during which the Mets were out-grand slammed 18-0.

On July 12, the Mets dealt closer Francisco Rodríguez to the Milwaukee Brewers for cash and Adrian Rosario and Danny Herrera. On July 27, the Mets agreed to trade Carlos Beltrán to the San Francisco Giants for minor league pitching prospect Zack Wheeler.

On September 1, the Mets announced that they will not sell minority ownership of the team to Einhorn.

The pregame ceremonies on September 11, fittingly, featured members of the 2001 team. Appropriately, singer Marc Anthony sang the national anthem, like he did on September 21, 2001. Throwing out the ceremonial first pitch was John Franco, the closer on their 2001 team to Mike Piazza, the catcher on their 2001 team.

José Reyes became the first player in Mets history to win the National League batting title by hitting .337.

Season standings

Record vs. opponents

Game log

|- align="center" bgcolor="ffbbbb"
| 1 || April 1 || @ Marlins|| 2–6 || Johnson (1–0) || Pelfrey (0–1) || || 41,237 || 0–1 || Boxscore
|- align="center" bgcolor="bbffbb"
| 2 || April 2 || @ Marlins|| 6–4 (10) || Rodríguez (1–0) || Webb (0–1) || Boyer (1) || 32,495 || 1–1 || Boxscore
|- align="center" bgcolor="bbffbb"
| 3 || April 3 || @ Marlins|| 9–2 || Dickey (1–0) || Vázquez (0–1) || || 18,936 || 2–1 || Boxscore
|- align="center" bgcolor="bbffbb"
| 4 || April 5 || @ Phillies|| 7–1 || Young (1–0)  || Hamels (0–1) || || 45,365 || 3–1  || Boxscore
|- align="center" bgcolor="ffbbbb"
| 5 || April 6 || @ Phillies|| 7–10 || Bastardo (1–0) || Boyer (0–1) || Contreras (1) || 45,061 || 3–2 || Boxscore
|- align="center" bgcolor="ffbbbb"
| 6 || April 7 || @ Phillies|| 0–11 || Halladay (1–0) || Niese (0–1) || || 45,468 || 3–3 || Boxscore
|- align="center" bgcolor="ffbbbb"
| 7 || April 8 || Nationals|| 2–6 || Zimmermann (1–1) || Dickey (1–1) || || 41,075 || 3–4 || Boxscore
|- align="center" bgcolor="bbffbb"
| 8 || April 9 || Nationals|| 8–4 || Capuano (1–0) || Gorzelanny (0–1) || Rodríguez (1) || 31,696 || 4–4 || Boxscore
|- align="center" bgcolor="ffbbbb"
| 9 || April 10 || Nationals|| 3–7 (11) || Storen (1–1) || Boyer (0–2) || || 35,157 || 4–5 || Boxscore
|- align="center" bgcolor="ffbbbb"
| 10 || April 11 || Rockies|| 6–7 || Belisle (2–0) || Parnell (0–1) || Street (5) || 24,865 || 4–6 || Boxscore
|- align="center" bgcolor="bbbbbb"
| -- || April 12 || Rockies|| colspan=7| Game Postponed (rain) (to be made up as a doubleheader on 4/14)
|- align="center" bgcolor="ffbbbb"
| 11 || April 13 || Rockies|| 4–5 || Rogers (2–0) || Niese (0–2) || Street (6) || 25,878 || 4–7 || Boxscore
|- align="center" bgcolor="ffbbbb"
| 12 || April 14 || Rockies|| 5–6 || Reynolds (1–0)|| Dickey (1–2) || Lindstrom (2)|| ||4–8 || Boxscore
|- align="center" bgcolor="ffbbbb"
| 13 || April 14 || Rockies|| 4–9 || de la Rosa    (2–0)||Capuano (1–1) || ||25,758|| 4–9|| Boxscore
|- align="center" bgcolor="bbbbbb"
| --  || April 15 || @ Braves||colspan=7|Game Postponed (rain) (to be made up as a doubleheader on 4/16)
|- align="center" bgcolor="ffbbbb"
| 14 || April 16 || @ Braves|| 2–4 || Lowe (2–2)||Carrasco (0–1) || Kimbrel (4) || || 4–10 || Boxscore
|- align="center" bgcolor="ffbbbb"
| 15 || April 16 || @ Braves|| 0–4 || Jurrjens (1–1) || Pelfrey (0–2) || || 31,383 || 4–11 || Boxscore
|- align="center" bgcolor="bbffbb"
| 16 || April 17 || @ Braves|| 3–2 ||Gee (1–0)||Hanson (1–2)||Rodríguez (2)|| 29,625 || 5–11 || Boxscore
|- align="center" bgcolor="ffbbbb"
| 17 || April 19 || Astros|| 1–6 || Rodríguez (1–2)|| Niese (0–3)|| ||27,032|| 5–12 || Boxscore
|- align="center" bgcolor="ffbbbb"
| 18 || April 20 || Astros|| 3–4 || Melancon (2–1)|| Dickey (1–3) || Lyon (4)||27,380||5–13|| Boxscore
|- align="center" bgcolor="bbffbb"
| 19 || April 21 || Astros|| 9–1 || Capuano (2–1) || Happ (1–3) || || 32,819 || 6–13 || Boxscore 
|- align="center" bgcolor="bbffbb"
| 20 || April 22 || Diamondbacks|| 4–1 || Pelfrey (1–2) || Vásquez (0–1) || Rodríguez (3) || 26,546 || 7–13 || Boxscore
|- align="center" bgcolor="bbffbb"
| 21 || April 23 || Diamondbacks|| 6–4 || Gee (2–0) || Enright (0–2) || Rodríguez (4) || 25,581 || 8–13 || Boxscore
|- align="center" bgcolor="bbffbb"
| 22 || April 24 || Diamondbacks|| 8–4 || Niese (1–3) || Galarraga (3–1) || || 22,232 || 9–13 || Boxscore
|- align="center" bgcolor="bbffbb"
| 23 || April 26 || @ Nationals|| 6–4 || Igarashi (1–0) || Zimmermann (1–4) || Rodríguez (5) || 14,603 || 10–13 || Boxscore
|- align="center" bgcolor="bbffbb"
| 24 || April 27 || @ Nationals|| 6–3 || Beato (1–0) || Burnett (0–1) || Rodríguez (6) || 13,568 || 11–13 || Boxscore
|- align="center" bgcolor="ffbbbb"
| 25 || April 28 || @ Nationals|| 3–4 || Hernández (3–2) || Capuano (2–2) || Storen (4) || 15,142 || 11–14 || Boxscore
|- align="center" bgcolor="ffbbbb"
| 26 || April 29 || @ Phillies|| 3–10 || Worley (1–0) || Pelfrey (1–3) || || 45,613 || 11–15 || Boxscore
|- align="center" bgcolor="ffbbbb"
| 27 || April 30 || @ Phillies|| 1–2 || Halladay (4–1) || Niese (1–4) || || 45,598 || 11–16 || Boxscore
|-

|- align="center" bgcolor="bbffbb"
| 28 || May 1 || @ Phillies || 2–1 (14) || Buchholz (1–0)  || Kendrick (1–2) || || 45,713 ||12–16|| Boxscore
|- align="center" bgcolor="ffbbbb"
| 29 || May 3 || Giants || 6–7 (10) || Lopez (1–0) || Buchholz (1–1) || Wilson (9) || 32,288 || 12–17 || Boxscore
|- align="center" bgcolor="ffbbbb"
| 30 || May 4 || Giants || 0–2 || Lincecum (3–3) || Capuano (2–3) || Wilson (10) || 29,333 || 12–18 || Boxscore
|- align="center" bgcolor="bbffbb"
| 31 || May 5 || Giants || 5–2 || Pelfrey (2–3) || Sánchez (2–2) || Rodríguez (7) || 23,433 || 13–18 || Boxscore
|- align="center" bgcolor="bbffbb"
| 32 || May 6 || Dodgers || 6–3 || Igarashi (2–0) || Kuroda (3–3) || Rodríguez (8) || 35,948 || 14–18 || Boxscore
|- align="center" bgcolor="bbffbb"
| 33 || May 7 || Dodgers || 4–2 || Byrdak (1–0) || MacDougal (0–1) || Rodríguez (9) || 31,464 || 15–18 || Boxscore
|- align="center" bgcolor="ffbbbb"
| 34 || May 8 || Dodgers || 2–4 || Kershaw (4–3) || Dickey (1–4) || Padilla (2) || 26,312 || 15–19 || Boxscore
|- align="center" bgcolor="ffbbbb"
| 35 || May 9 || @ Rockies || 1–2 || Belisle (3–2) || Capuano (2–4) || Street (12) || 31,885 || 15–20 || Boxscore
|- align="center" bgcolor="bbffbb"
| 36 || May 10 || @ Rockies || 4–3 ||Pelfrey (3–3)|| Hammel (3–2)  || Rodríguez (10) ||31,007 || 16–20 ||Boxscore
|- align="center" bgcolor="bbbbbb"
| – || May 11 || @ Rockies || colspan=7 | Postponed (rain) Rescheduled for May 12
|- align="center" bgcolor="bbffbb"
| 37 || May 12 || @ Rockies || 9–5 || Niese (2–4) || Jiménez (0–3) || || 21,422 || 17–20 || Boxscore
|- align="center" bgcolor="bbffbb"
| 38 || May 13 || @ Astros || 6–4 || Misch (1–0) || Fulchino (0–1) || Rodríguez (11) || 28,791 || 18–20 || Boxscore
|- align="center" bgcolor="ffbbbb"
| 39 || May 14 || @ Astros || 3–7 || Happ (3–4) || Dickey (1–5) || || 31,140 || 18–21 || Boxscore 
|- align="center" bgcolor="bbffbb"
| 40 || May 15 || @ Astros || 7–4 || Capuano (3–4) || Rodríguez (0–2) || Rodríguez (12) || 28,406 || 19–21 || Boxscore
|- align="center" bgcolor="ffbbbb"
| 41 || May 16 || Marlins ||1–2 (11) ||Badenhop(1–0)||Igarashi(2–1)||Núñez (15) || 23,721||19–22 || Boxscore
|- align="center" bgcolor="bbbbbb"
| – || May 17 || Marlins || colspan=7 | Postponed (rain) Rescheduled for July 18
|- align="center" bgcolor="bbffbb"
| 42 || May 18 || Nationals || 3–0 || Niese (3–4) || Gorzelanny(2–3) || Rodríguez (13) || 24,527 || 20–22 || Boxscore
|- align="center" bgcolor="bbffbb"
| 43 || May 19 || Nationals || 1–0 || Gee (3–0) || Hernández (3–6) || Rodríguez (14) || 26,835|| 21–22 || Boxscore
|- align="center" bgcolor="bbffbb"
| 44 || May 20 || @ Yankees || 2–1 || Dickey (2–5) || García (2–4) || Rodríguez (15) || 47,874 || 22–22 || Boxscore
|- align="center" bgcolor="ffbbbb"
| 45 || May 21 || @ Yankees || 3–7 || Burnett (5–3) || Capuano (3–5) || || 48,286 || 22–23 || Boxscore
|- align="center" bgcolor="ffbbbb"
| 46 || May 22 || @ Yankees || 3–9 || Ayala (1–0) || Pelfrey (3–4) || || 48,293 || 22–24 || Boxscore
|- align="center" bgcolor="ffbbbb"
| 47 || May 24 || @ Cubs || 1–11 || Dempster (3–4) || Niese (3–5) || || 35,707 || 22–25 || Boxscore
|- align="center" bgcolor="bbffbb"
| 48 || May 25 || @ Cubs || 7–4 (7) || Gee (4–0) || Coleman (2–4) || || 36,666 || 23–25 || Boxscore
|- align="center" bgcolor="ffbbbb"
| 49 || May 26 || @ Cubs ||3–9||Zambrano (5–2)||Beato (1–1)|| ||33,378 ||23–26 ||Boxscore
|- align="center" bgcolor="ffbbbb"
| 50 || May 27 || Phillies ||4–6|| Bastardo (3–0)|| Rodríguez (1–1) || Madson (10)|| 33,882 ||23–27||Boxscore
|- align="center" bgcolor="ffbbbb"
| 51 || May 28 || Phillies ||2–5||Hamels (7–2) ||O'Connor (0–1) ||Madson (11)|| 29,337 ||23–28||Boxscore
|- align="center" bgcolor="bbffbb"
| 52 || May 29 || Phillies ||9–5||Niese (4–5) ||Worley (2–1) || || 30,791 ||24–28 ||Boxscore
|- align="center" bgcolor="bbffbb"
| 53 || May 30 || Pirates ||7–3|| Gee (5–0)|| |McCutchen (1–1)
|| ||24,490||25–28||Boxscore
|- align="center" bgcolor="ffbbbb"
| 54 || May 31 || Pirates ||1–5||Meek (1–1)||Dickey (2–6)|| ||26,198||25–29||Boxscore
|-

|- align="center" bgcolor="ffbbbb"
| 55 || June 1 || Pirates ||3–9||Correia (8–4) ||Capuano (3–6) || ||25,234||25–30 ||Boxscore
|- align="center" bgcolor="bbffbb"
| 56 || June 2 || Pirates ||9–8|| Isringhausen (1–0) || Veras (1–2) ||  Rodríguez (16) ||30,074||26–30||Boxscore
|- align="center" bgcolor="ffbbbb"
| 57 || June 3 || Braves || 3–6 || Venters (4–0)|| Rodríguez (1–2) || Kimbrel (17) || 28,301 || 26–31 || Boxscore
|- align="center" bgcolor="bbffbb"
| 58 || June 4 || Braves || 5–0 || Gee (6–0) || Jurrjens (7–2) || || 28,114 || 27–31 || Boxscore
|- align="center" bgcolor="bbffbb"
| 59 || June 5 || Braves || 6–4 || Dickey (3–6) || Hudson (4–5) || || 21,015 || 28–31 || Boxscore
|- align="center" bgcolor="bbffbb"
| 60 || June 7 || @ Brewers || 2–1 || Capuano (4–6) || Estrada (1–2) || Rodríguez (17) || 27,064 || 29–31 || Boxscore
|- align="center" bgcolor="ffbbbb"
| 61 || June 8 || @ Brewers || 6–7 || Axford (2–1) || Thayer (0–1) || || 26,144 || 29–32 || Boxscore
|- align="center" bgcolor="bbffbb"
| 62 || June 9 || @ Brewers || 4–1 || Niese (5–5) || Gallardo (8–3) || Rodríguez (18) || 30,632 || 30–32 || Boxscore
|- align="center" bgcolor="bbffbb"
| 63 || June 10 || @ Pirates || 8–1 || Gee (7–0) || Morton (6–3) || || 24,653 || 31–32 || Boxscore
|- align="center" bgcolor="ffbbbb"
| 64 || June 11 || @ Pirates || 2–3 || McDonald (4–4) || Dickey (3–7) || Hanrahan (16)
|| 39,273 || 31–33 || Boxscore
|- align="center" bgcolor="bbffbb"
| 65 || June 12 || @ Pirates || 7–0 || Capuano (5–6) || Correia (8–5) || || 26,452 || 32–33 || Boxscore
|- align="center" bgcolor="ffbbbb"
| 66 || June 13 || @ Pirates || 1–3 || Malholm (3–7) || Pelfrey (3–5) || Hanrahan (17) || 15,555 || 32–34 || Boxscore
|- align="center" bgcolor="bbffbb"
| 67 || June 14 || @ Braves ||4–3|| Niese (6–5) || Jurrjens (8–3) || Rodríguez (19) || 32,161 || 33–34 || Boxscore
|- align="center" bgcolor="bbffbb"
| 68 || June 15 || @ Braves ||4–0||Parnell (1–1) ||Hudson (5–6) ||  || 31,161 || 34–34 ||Boxscore
|- align="center" bgcolor="ffbbbb"
| 69 || June 16 || @ Braves || 8–9 (10) || Linebrink (3–1) || Carrasco (0–2) || || 26,077 || 34–35 || Boxscore
|- align="center" bgcolor="ffbbbb"
| 70 || June 17 || Angels || 3–4 || Piñeiro (3–3)
|| Capuano (5–7) || Walden (16) || 29,513 || 34–36 || Boxscore
|- align="center" bgcolor="bbffbb"
| 71 || June 18 || Angels || 6–1 || Pelfrey (4–5) || Haren (6–5) || || 31,538 || 35–36 || Boxscore
|- align="center" bgcolor="ffbbbb"
| 72 || June 19 || Angels || 3–7 || Chatwood (4–4) || Niese (6–6) || || 36,213 || 35–37 || Boxscore 
|- align="center" bgcolor="ffbbbb"
| 73 || June 21 || Athletics || 3–7 ||Outman (3–1) ||Gee (7–1)  ||Balfour (2) || 37,019 ||35–38 || Boxscore
|- align="center" bgcolor="bbffbb"
| 74 || June 22 || Athletics || 3–2 (13) || Parnell (2–1) || Ziegler (2–1) || || 38,813 || 36–38 || Boxscore
|- align="center" bgcolor="bbffbb"
| 75 || June 23 || Athletics || 4–1 || Capuano (6–7) || Godfrey (1–1) || Rodríguez (20) || 30,168 || 37–38 || Boxscore
|- align="center" bgcolor="ffbbbb"
| 76 || June 24 || @ Rangers || 1–8 || Harrison (6–6) || Pelfrey (4–6) || || 46,092 ||37–39 || Boxscore
|- align="center" bgcolor="bbffbb"
| 77 || June 25 || @ Rangers || 14–5 || Niese (7–6) || Ogando (7–3) ||  || 37,292 || 38–39 || Boxscore
|- align="center" bgcolor="bbffbb"
| 78 || June 26 || @ Rangers || 8–5 || Gee (8–1) || Holland (6–3) ||  || 37,879 || 39–39 || Boxscore
|- align="center" bgcolor="bbffbb"
| 79 || June 28 || @ Tigers || 14–3 || Dickey (4–7) || Porcello (6–6) || || 28,480 || 40–39 || Boxscore
|- align="center" bgcolor="bbffbb"
| 80 || June 29 || @ Tigers || 16–9 || Capuano (7–7)|| Coke (1–8)|| || 26,338 || 41–39 ||Boxscore
|- align="center" bgcolor="ffbbbb"
| 81 || June 30 || @ Tigers || 2–5 || Verlander (11–3) || Pelfrey (4–7) || Valverde (19) || 31,861 || 41–40 ||Boxscore
|-

|- align="center" bgcolor="ffbbbb"
| 82 || July 1 || Yankees ||1–5 ||Nova (8–4) ||Niese (7–7) || || 42,020 || 41–41 ||Boxscore
|- align="center" bgcolor="ffbbbb"
| 83 || July 2 || Yankees ||2–5|| Colón (6–3) ||Gee (8–2) || || 42,042 || 41–42 ||Boxscore
|- align="center" bgcolor="bbffbb"
| 84 || July 3 || Yankees || 3–2 (10) || Rodríguez (2–2) || Ayala (1–2) || || 41,513 || 42–42 || Boxscore
|- align="center" bgcolor="bbffbb"
| 85 || July 4 || @ Dodgers ||5–2|| Capuano  (8–7) ||De La Rosa (3–4) ||Rodríguez (21) ||56,000 ||43–42||Boxscore
|- align="center" bgcolor="bbffbb"
| 86 || July 5 || @ Dodgers || 6–0 || Pelfrey (5–7) ||Lilly (5–9)|| || 32,329 ||44–42||Boxscore
|- align="center" bgcolor="bbffbb"
| 87 || July 6 || @ Dodgers || 5–3 || Niese (8–7) ||Kuroda (6–10) ||Rodríguez (22) ||31,005 ||45–42 ||Boxscore
|- align="center" bgcolor="ffbbbb"
| 88 || July 7 || @ Dodgers || 0–6 ||Kershaw (9–4) ||Gee (8–3) || || 56,000 ||45–43||Boxscore
|- align="center" bgcolor="bbffbb"
| 89 || July 8 || @ Giants ||5–2||Beato (2–1) ||Wilson (6–2)  ||Rodríguez (23) || 41,028 || 46–43 ||Boxscore
|- align="center" bgcolor="ffbbbb"
| 90 || July 9 || @ Giants || 1–3 || Lincecum (7–7) || Capuano (8–8) || Romo (1)|| 42,117 || 46–44 || Boxscore
|- align="center" bgcolor="ffbbbb"
| 91 || July 10 || @ Giants || 2–4 || Cain (8–5) || Pelfrey (5–8) ||Wilson (26) || 42,123 || 46–45 || Boxscore
|- align="center" bgcolor="ffbbbb"
| 92 || July 15 || Phillies || 2–7 || Worley (5–1) || Dickey (4–8) || || 37,304 || 46–46 || Boxscore
|- align="center" bgcolor="bbffbb"
| 93 || July 16 || Phillies || 11–2 || Niese (9–7) || Hamels (11–5) || || 41,166 || 47–46 || Boxscore
|- align="center" bgcolor="ffbbbb"
| 94 || July 17 || Phillies || 5–8 || Kendrick (5–4) || Pelfrey (5–9) || Bastardo (6) || 34,695 || 47–47 || Boxscore
|- align="center" bgcolor="ffbbbb"
| 95 || July 18 ||  Marlins || 1–4 || Hensley (1–2) || Capuano (8–9) || Núñez (27) || 32,411 || 47–48 || Boxscore 
|- align="center" bgcolor="bbffbb"
| 96 || July 19 || Cardinals || 4–2 ||Gee (9–3) ||Lohse (8–7) ||Isringhausen (1) ||35,448||48–48||Boxscore 
|- align="center" bgcolor="bbffbb"
| 97 || July 20 || Cardinals || 6–5 (10) ||Isringhausen (2–0) ||Salas(5–4) || ||30,770 ||49–48 ||Boxscore 
|- align="center" bgcolor="ffbbbb"
| 98 || July 21 || Cardinals || 2–6 || Westbrook (8–4)||Niese (9–8) || ||37,416 ||49–49||Boxscore
|- align="center" bgcolor="bbffbb"
| 99 || July 22 || @ Marlins || 7–6 ||Parnell (3–1)|| Mujica (8–3)  ||Isringhausen (2)||21,304 ||50–49||Boxscore
|- align="center" bgcolor="ffbbbb"
| 100 || July 23 || @ Marlins || 5–8 ||Badenhop (2–1) ||Capuano (8–10)|| ||26,345 ||50–50||Boxscore
|- align="center" bgcolor="ffbbbb"
| 101 || July 24 || @ Marlins || 2–5 || Choate (1–1) || Parnell (3–2) || Núñez (28) || 20,416 || 50–51 || Boxscore
|- align="center" bgcolor="bbffbb"
| 102 || July 25 || @ Reds || 4–2 || Dickey (5–8) || Leake (8–6) ||Isringhausen (3)|| 25,480 || 51–51 || Boxscore
|- align="center" bgcolor="bbffbb"
| 103 || July 26 || @ Reds || 8–6 || Niese (9–8) || Cueto (6–4) || Byrdak (1) || 27,552 || 52–51 || Boxscore
|- align="center" bgcolor="bbffbb"
| 104 || July 27 || @ Reds || 8–2 || Pelfrey (6–9) || Arroyo (7–9) || || 23,616 || 53–51 || Boxscore
|- align="center" bgcolor="bbffbb"
| 105 || July 28 || @ Reds || 10–9 || Capuano (9–10) || Bailey (5–5) || Isringhausen (4) || 25,400 || 54–51 || Boxscore
|- align="center" bgcolor="bbffbb"
| 106 || July 29 || @ Nationals || 8–5 || Gee (10–3) || Wang (0–1) || Isringhausen (5) || 30,114 || 55–51 || Boxscore
|- align="center" bgcolor="ffbbbb"
| 107 || July 30 || @ Nationals || 0–3 || Maya (1–1) || Dickey (5–8) || Storen (26) || 35,414 || 55–52 || Boxscore
|- align="center" bgcolor="ffbbbb"
| 108 || July 31 || @ Nationals || 2–3 || Storen (6–2) || Parnell (3–3) || || 25,307 || 55–53 || Boxscore
|-

|- align="center" bgcolor="ffbbbb"
| 109 || August 1 || Marlins || 3–7 (10) || Núñez (1–2) || Isringhausen (2–1) || || 28,862 || 55–54 || Boxscore
|- align="center" bgcolor="ffbbbb"
| 110 || August 2 || Marlins || 3–4 || Cishek (2–1) || Isringhausen (2–2) || Núñez (31) || 33,297 || 55–55 || Boxscore
|- align="center" bgcolor="bbbbbb"
| — || August 3 || Marlins || colspan=7| Game Postponed (rain) (to be made up on August 29 as part of a doubleheader)
|- align="center" bgcolor="ffbbbb"
| 111 || August 5 || Braves || 1–4 || Hudson (11–7) || Dickey (5–10) || Kimbrel (33) || 30,607 || 55–56 || Boxscore
|- align="center" bgcolor="bbffbb"
| 112 || August 6 || Braves || 11–7 || Niese (11–8) || Hanson (11–7) || || 33,556 || 56–56 ||Boxscore
|- align="center" bgcolor="ffbbbb"
| 113 || August 7 || Braves || 5–6 || Venters (6–1) || Parnell (3–4) || Kimbrel (34) || 29,853 || 56–57 || Boxscore
|- align="center" bgcolor="bbffbb"
| 114 || August 8 || Padres || 9–8 || Isringhausen (3–2) || Bell (2–4) || || 21,814 || 57–57 || Boxscore
|- align="center" bgcolor="bbffbb"
| 115 || August 9 || Padres || 5–4 || Carrasco (1–2) || Qualls (5–6) || Isringhausen (6) || 24,619 || 58–57 || Boxscore
|- align="center" bgcolor="ffbbbb"
| 116 || August 10 || Padres || 5–9 || Harang (11–3) || Dickey (5–11) || || 39,589 || 58–58 || Boxscore
|- align="center" bgcolor="ffbbbb"
| 117 || August 11 || Padres || 2–3 || Qualls (6–6) || Niese (11–9) || Bell (32) || 32,348 || 58–59 || Boxscore
|- align="center" bgcolor="ffbbbb"
| 118 || August 12 || @ Diamondbacks || 3–4 || Kennedy (15–3) || Gee (10–4)|| Putz (28) || 25,701 || 58–60 || Boxscore
|- align="center" bgcolor="ffbbbb"
| 119 || August 13 || @ Diamondbacks || 4–6 || Hudson (12–8) || Carrasco (1–3) || Putz (29) || 33,552 || 58–61 || Boxscore
|- align="center" bgcolor="ffbbbb"
| 120 || August 14 || @ Diamondbacks || 3–5 || Duke (3–4) || Capuano (9–11) || Hernandez (11) || 30,148 || 58–62 || Boxscore
|- align="center" bgcolor="bbffbb"
| 121 || August 15 || @ Padres || 5–4  (10) || Acosta (1–0) || Spence (0–2) || Isringhausen (7) || 30,094 || 59–62 || Boxscore
|- align="center" bgcolor="ffbbbb"
| 122 || August 16 || @ Padres || 1–6 || Luebke (5–6) || Niese (11–10) || || 24,212 || 59–63 || Boxscore
|- align="center" bgcolor="bbffbb"
| 123 || August 17 || @ Padres || 7–3 || Gee (11–4) || Latos (6–12) || || 22,089 || 60–63 || Boxscore
|- align="center" bgcolor="ffbbbb"
| 124 || August 19 || Brewers || 1–6 || Marcum (11–3) || Pelfrey (6–10) || || 24,470 || 60–64 || Boxscore
|- align="center" bgcolor="ffbbbb"
| 125 || August 20 || Brewers || 9–11 || Rodríguez (5–2) || Isringhausen (3–3) || Axford (37) || 28,234 || 60–65 || Boxscore
|- align="center" bgcolor="ffbbbb"
| 126 || August 21 || Brewers || 2–6 || Gallardo (14–8) || Acosta (1–1) || || 25,949 || 60–66 || Boxscore
|- align="center" bgcolor="ffbbbb"
| 127 || August 22 || @ Phillies || 0–10 || Lee (14–7) || Gee (11–5) || || 45,783 || 60–67 || Boxscore
|- align="center" bgcolor="ffbbbb"
| 128 || August 23 || @ Phillies || 4–9 || Worley (9–1) || Niese (11–11) || || 45,770 || 60–68 || Boxscore
|- align="center" bgcolor="bbffbb"
| 129 || August 24 || @ Phillies || 7–4 || Pelfrey (7–10) || Kendrick (7–6) || Parnell (1) || 45,689 || 61–68 || Boxscore
|- align="center" bgcolor="bbffbb"
| 130 || August 26 || Braves || 6–0 || Capuano (10–11) || Hudson (13–8) || || 22,736 || 62–68 || Boxscore
|- align="center" bgcolor="bbbbbb"
| —  || August 27 || Braves || colspan='7' rowspan='2'|Games Postponed (Hurricane Irene) (to be made up on September 8 as a doubleheader) 
|- align="center" bgcolor="bbbbbb"
| —  || August 28 || Braves
|- align="center" bgcolor="bbffbb"
| 131 || August 29 || Marlins || 2–1 || Dickey (6–11) || Sánchez (7–7) || Parnell (2) || || 63–68 || Boxscore
|- align="center" bgcolor="bbffbb"
| 132 || August 29 || Marlins || 5–1 || Gee (12–5) || Nolasco (9–10) || ||29,335  || 64–68 || Boxscore
|- align="center" bgcolor="ffbbbb"
| 133 || August 30 || Marlins || 0–6 || Vázquez (8–11)  || Pelfrey (7–11) || || 30,806 || 64–69 || Boxscore 
|- align="center" bgcolor="bbffbb"
| 134 || August 31 || Marlins || 3–2 ||Acosta (2–1) ||Volstad (5–12)  ||Parnell (3) ||27,905 ||65–69||Boxscore 
|-

|- align="center" bgcolor="bbffbb"
| 135 || September 1 || Marlins || 7–5 ||Batista (4–2)  ||Hensley (2–6)  ||Parnell (4) ||27,562 || 66–69 ||Boxscore 
|- align="center" bgcolor="bbffbb"
| 136 || September 2 || @ Nationals || 7–3 || Dickey (7–11) || Detwiler (2–5) || || 27,907 || 67–69 || Boxscore
|- align="center" bgcolor="ffbbbb"
| 137 || September 3 || @ Nationals || 7–8 || Burnett (5–5) || Parnell (3–5) || || 34,821 || 67–70 || Boxscore
|- align="center" bgcolor="bbffbb" 
| 138 || September 4 || @ Nationals || 6–3 || Igarashi (3–1) || Hernández (8–13) || Parnell (5) || 29,679 || 68–70 || Boxscore
|- align="center" bgcolor="ffbbbb"
| 139 || September 5 || @ Marlins ||3–9||Vázquez (9–11) ||Capuano (10–12) || ||21,112 ||68–71||Boxscore
|- align="center" bgcolor="bbffbb"
| 140 || September 6 || @ Marlins ||7–4 (12) || Igarashi (4–1) || Ceda (0–1) ||Stinson (1)  ||22,318 ||69–71||Boxscore
|- align="center" bgcolor="bbffbb"
| 141 || September 7 || @ Marlins ||1–0||Dickey (8–11)|| Hand (1–6) ||Acosta (1)||21,303||70–71||Boxscore
|- align="center" bgcolor="ffbbbb"
| 142 || September 8 || Braves ||5–6||Minor (5–2)||Schwinden(0–1)||Kimbrel (43)||25,953||70–72||Boxscore
|- align="center" bgcolor="ffbbbb"
| 143 || September 8 || Braves ||1–5||Teherán (1–1)||Gee (12–6)|| ||25,953||70–73||Boxscore
|- align="center" bgcolor="bbffbb"
| 144 || September 9 || Cubs ||5–4||Acosta (3–1)||Marshall (6–6)|| ||27,639||71–73||Boxscore
|- align="center" bgcolor="ffbbbb"
| 145 || September 10 || Cubs || 4–5 ||Wood (3–5)||Parnell (3–6)||Mármol (34)||30,443||71–74||Boxscore
|- align="center" bgcolor="ffbbbb"
| 146 || September 11 || Cubs || 6–10 || Ortiz (1–2) ||Stinson (0–1) || || 33,502 || 71–75 || Boxscore
|- align="center" bgcolor="ffbbbb"
| 147 || September 12 || Nationals || 2–3 || Coffey (5–1) || Dickey (8–12) || Storen (35) || 27,015 || 71–76 ||Boxscore
|- align="center" bgcolor="ffbbbb"
| 148 || September 13 || Nationals || 2–3 || Stammen (1–1) || Thayer (0–2) || Storen (36) || 25,359 || 71–77 || Boxscore
|- align="center" bgcolor="ffbbbb"
| 149 || September 14 || Nationals || 0–2 ||Peacock || Pelfrey (7–12) || Storen (37) || 26,885 || 71–78 || Boxscore
|- align="center" bgcolor="ffbbbb"
| 150 || September 15 || Nationals || 1–10 || Milone (1–0) || Schwinden (0–2) || || 22,205 || 71–79 || Boxscore
|- align="center" bgcolor="bbffbb"
| 151 || September 16 || @ Braves || 12–2 || Capuano (11–12) || Lowe (9–15) || ||43,901 || 72–79 ||Boxscore
|- align="center" bgcolor="ffbbbb"
| 152 || September 17 || @ Braves || 0–1 || Hudson (15–10) || Dickey (8–13) || Kimbrel (45) ||46,763 || 72–80 ||Boxscore
|- align="center" bgcolor="bbffbb"
| 153 || September 18 || @ Braves || 7–5 || Byrdak (2–0) || Venters (6–2) ||Acosta (2) ||39,862 || 73–80 ||Boxscore
|- align="center" bgcolor="ffbbbb"
| 154 || September 20 || @ Cardinals || 6–11 || Dotel (4–3) || Stinson (0–2) || || 37,746 || 73–81|| Boxscore 
|- align="center" bgcolor="ffbbbb"
| 155 || September 21 || @ Cardinals || 5–6 || Garcia (13–7) || Herrera (0–1) || Motte (8) || 40,658 || 73–82|| Boxscore
|- align="center" bgcolor="bbffbb"
| 156 || September 22 || @ Cardinals || 8–6 || Acosta (4–1) || Rzepczynski (2–6) || Parnell (6) || 35,992 || 74–82|| Boxscore
|- align="center" bgcolor="bbbbbb"
| 157 || September 23 || Phillies || colspan=7| Game Postponed (rain) rescheduled for September 24
|- align="center" bgcolor="bbffbb"
| 157 || September 24 || Phillies || 6–3||Gee (13–6) || Herndon (1–4)||Acosta (4) ||32,437 ||75–82 ||
|- align="center" bgcolor="bbffbb"
| 158 || September 24 || Phillies || 2–1||Parnell (4–6) ||Lidge (0–2) ||Acosta (5) ||33,961 ||76–82 ||
|- align="center" bgcolor="ffbbbb"
| 159 || September 25 || Phillies ||4–9 ||Halladay (19–6) ||Pelfrey (7–13) || ||32,796 ||76–83 ||
|- align="center" bgcolor="ffbbbb"
| 160 || September 26 || Reds || 5–6|| Ondrusek (5–5)||Byrdak (2–1) || Cordero (36) || 28,651||76–84 ||
|- align="center" bgcolor="ffbbbb"
| 161 || September 27 || Reds ||4–5 || LeCure (2–1)|| Thayer (0–3)|| Cordero (37)||30,027 || 76–85||
|- align="center" bgcolor="bbffbb"
| 162 || September 28 || Reds || 3–0||Batista (5–2) ||Volquez (5–7) || ||28,816 ||77–85 ||
|-

Roster

Player stats

Batting
Note: G = Games played; AB = At bats; R = Runs scored; H = Hits; 2B = Doubles; 3B = Triples; HR = Home Runs; RBI = Runs batted in; SB = Stolen bases; BB = Base on balls;  AVG = Batting average;

Pitching
Note: W = Wins; L = Losses; ERA = Earned run average; G = Games pitched; GS = Games started; SV = Saves; IP = Innings pitched; H = Hits allowed; R = Runs allowed; ER = Earned runs allowed; BB = Walks allowed;  SO = Strikeouts

Farm system

References

External links
2011 New York Mets season Official Site
2011 New York Mets season at Baseball Reference
2011 New York Mets season at ESPN

New York Mets seasons
New York Mets season
New York Mets
2010s in Queens
Flushing, Queens